Chaiyaphum is one of Thailand's seventy-six provinces (changwat), located in central northeastern Thailand, also called Isan. Neighboring provinces are (from north clockwise) Khon Kaen, Nakhon Ratchasima, Lopburi, and Phetchabun.

Toponymy
The word chaiya originates from the Sanskrit word jaya meaning 'victory', and the word phum from Sanskrit bhumi meaning 'earth' or 'land'. Hence the name of the province literally means 'land of victory'. The Malay/Indonesian/Sanskrit word jayabumi is equivalent.

Geography

The province is bisected by the Phetchabun mountain range, with the highest elevation in the province at 1,222 m. The east of the province is part of the Khorat Plateau.

Tat Ton National Park is in the northwest, featuring some scenic waterfalls and dry dipterocarp forests. The biggest attraction of the Sai Thong National Park in the west is the Sai Thong waterfall, but also some fields of the Siam tulip. Similar fields can be found in the Pa Hin Ngam National Park in the southwest. This park's name ('beautiful rock forest') derives from the strangely-shaped rock formations found there. Phu Laenkha National Park covers 200 km2 of forested hills northwest of Chaiyaphum city.

National parks
There are a total of six national parks, ofwhich four are in region 7 (Nakhon Ratchasima) and Nam Nao in region 11 (Phitsanulok) and Nam Phong in region 8 (Khon Kaen) of Thailand's protected areas.   
 Nam Nao National Park, 
 Sai Thong National Park, 
 Tat Ton National Park, 
 Nam Phong National Park, 
 Phu Laenkha National Park, 
 Pa Hin Ngam National Park,

Wildlife sanctuaries
There are a total of three wildlife sanctuaries, ofwhich two along with one other wildlife sanctuary, make up region 7 (Nakhon Ratchasima) and Tabo–Huai Yai in region 11 (Phitsanulok) of Thailand's protected areas.
 Phu Khiao Wildlife Sanctuary, 
 Tabo–Huai Yai Wildlife Sanctuary, 
 Pha Phueng Wildlife Sanctuary,

History
The history of the city of Chaiyaphum dates back to the Khmer Empire in the 12th century, when it was a small city on the route from Angkor to Prasat Singh (Kanchanaburi province).

In 1817 the area was settled by Lao people led by Nai Lae, an official of King Anouvong of Vientiane, which was a tributary state of the Thai monarch. They settled in Baan Nam Khun Nong E Chan in Nakhon Ratchasima province, but soon abandoned it in favor of Ban Luang (today's city of Chaiyaphum). In 1826 Anouvong rebelled against the Thai King Rama III, seeking to gain complete independence. Nai Lae, by then made a chao praya by the Thai monarch, supported the Siamese troops. Chao Phaya Lae was killed defending his city against Anouvong's army, but Anouvong was defeated by Thai forces weeks later and Anouvong taken in chains to Bangkok. King Rama III remembered Chao Phraya Lae for his loyalty and awarded him the title Phraya Phakdi Chumpon. He is still a local hero and his statue has become a symbol of the province.

People
Most people in Chaiyaphum province are ethnically Lao. The first language of most people is the Lao language.

Economy

The principal crops of Chaiyaphum include rice, tapioca, sugar cane, and taro root. Chulabhorn Dam, in Thung Lui Lai Subdistrict, Khon San district is a major source of irrigation water. Due to the severe drought in 2019, the Royal Irrigation Department (RID) is proposing to build three more dams in Chaiyaphum: Wang Saphung Dam in Nong Bua Daeng District, Lam Nam Chee Dam in Ban Khwao District, and Prong Khun Petch Dam in Nong Bua Rawe District. The dams would have a combined capacity of 160 million m3 of water, which could irrigate  127,000 rai of farmland.

Symbols
The provincial seal shows a triangular flag, a symbol of victory in war.

The provincial tree is the Siamese senna (Cassia siamea), and the provincial flower the Siam Tulip (Curcuma alismatifolia).

The provincial slogan เมืองโบราณ บ้านนักสู้ ภูเสียดฟ้า ป่าช้างหลาย ทุ่งไพรรก น้ำตกใส ผ้าไหมดี สตรีงาม แดนธรรมแดนทอง
translates to 'Enchanted city, home to heroes, mountain peaks, elephant forests, waterfalls, beautiful silk, lovely ladies, conscientious Buddhists'.

Administrative divisions

Provincial government
The province is divided into 16 districts (amphoes). The districts are further divided into 124 subdistricts (tambons) and 1393 villages (mubans).

Local government
As of 26 November 2019 there are: one Chaiyaphum Provincial Administration Organisation and 36 municipal (thesaban) areas in the province. Chaiyaphum has town (thesaban mueang) status. Further 35 subdistrict municipalities (thesaban tambon). The non-municipal areas are administered by 106 Subdistrict Administrative Organisations - SAO (ongkan borihan suan tambon).

Human achievement index 2017

Since 2003, United Nations Development Programme (UNDP) in Thailand has tracked progress on human development at sub-national level using the Human achievement index (HAI), a composite index covering all the eight key areas of human development. National Economic and Social Development Board (NESDB) has taken over this task since 2017.

Gallery

See also
Khit cloth

References

External links

https://web.archive.org/web/20100106134642/http://www.chaiyaphum.go.th/  Official website (Thai)

 
Provinces of Thailand